Rita is a Danish comedy-drama television series created by Christian Torpe for TV 2. It premiered in Denmark on 9 February 2012, and concluded on 20 July 2020, with 40 episodes broadcast over five seasons. Produced by SF Studios, the series was filmed in Rødovre, Zealand, and executive-produced by Keld Reinicke, Karoline Leth, Lars Bjørn Hansen, Birdie Bjerregaard, Christian Rank, Jennifer Green, and Torpe, who also served as head writer. All episodes are available internationally on streaming service Netflix , who partnered with TV 2 to produce the later three seasons, becoming a Netflix Original.

Mille Dinesen portrays the lead role of Rita Madsen, a headstrong and unconventional teacher and single mother who protects and helps her students but struggles to manage her own personal life. One of Rita's closest friends is portrayed by Lise Baastrup, the only other actor who appeared in all the episodes besides Dinesen; a spin-off centered on the character, Hjørdis, was broadcast between 18 May and 8 June 2015, consisting of four episodes. In the story, Hjørdis tries to put together a school play about bullying, one of the many social themes discussed throughout Rita.

Upon airing, Rita received generally favorable response from critics.

Premise 
Rita Madsen, a compulsive smoker, is an unconventional secondary education teacher who, according to her, chose this profession "to protect students from their parents". While she goes out of her way to advise and help her pupils, Rita's personal and family life seems to need the same kind of assistance. Her youngest son, Jeppe, is discovering his sexuality, while the older ones, Ricco and Molly, are experiencing the mishaps of adulthood. Other main characters include Hjørdis, a naive teacher who becomes Rita's best friend; Rasmus, the school headmaster with whom Rita has an on-again, off-again relationship; Helle, school counselor and former Rita's rival, Uffe, Hjørdis' husband and Jonas, a former school headmaster who is now a rather self-assured teacher at Rita's school.

Cast and characters

Main 
 Mille Dinesen as Rita Madsen, an unconventional  teacher and single mother. Tessa Hoder portrays a young Rita in season 4.
 Lise Baastrup as Hjørdis, a naive teacher and Rita's best friend.
 Carsten Bjørnlund as Rasmus (seasons 1–3 and 5), school headmaster in seasons 1-2, and on-again, off-again boyfriend with Rita and Helle.
 Ellen Hillingsø as Helle (seasons 1–3; guest season 5), school counselor in seasons 1-3.
 Nikolaj Groth as Jeppe Madsen (seasons 1–3 and 5, guest season 4), Rita's gay youngest son.
 Morten Vang Simonsen as Ricco Madsen (seasons 1–2; guest season 3), Rita's oldest son.
 Sara Hjort Ditlevsen as Molly Madsen (seasons 1; guest seasons 2–5), Rita's daughter.
 Kristoffer Fabricius as Uffe (season 3-5, guest season 1-2), Hjørdis' boyfriend and, eventually, husband.

Recurring 
 Lykke Sand Michelsen as Bitten Dyrehave (seasons 1–2), Ricco's wife
 Carsten Nørgaard as Tom Dyrehave (seasons 1–2), Bitten's father and Rita's ex-boyfriend
 Lotte Andersen as Jette Dyrehave (seasons 1–2), Bitten's mother
 Lea Maria Høyer Stensnaes as Rosa (season 1), student
 Ferdinand Glad Bach as David (seasons 1–3), Jeppe's boyfriend
 Peter Gantzler as Niels Madsen (seasons 1–2, 5), Rita's ex-husband 
 Alexandre Willaume as Jonas Poulsen (seasons 2–3), schoolteacher
 Tommy Kenter as Erik (season 2), schoolteacher
 Zaki Youssef as Said (season 3), Rita's crush
 Belal Faiz as Karim (season 3), student and Said's brother
 Frederik Winther Rasmussen as Niklas Verner (season 3), student
 Charlotte Fich as Alice Verner (season 3), Niklas' mom and city mayor
 Ole Lemmeke as Bjarne (season 4), headmaster
 Charlotte Munck as Lea (season 4), Rita's childhood friend
 Tessa Hoder as young Rita (season 4)
 Sofie Juul as young Lea (season 4)
 Christine Exner as Susanne (season 4), Lea's mother and Rita's teacher in 1985
 Kurt Ravn as Rostrup (season 4), Rita's teacher in 1985
 William Friis Nelausen as Reinulf (seasons 4–5), Hjørdis' and Uffe's son
 Søs Egelind as Gerd (season 5), Rita's student
 Ari Alexander as Ole (season 5), Jeppe's crush

Guest 
 Lisbet Lundquist as Lillebeth Schmidt Kronborg (season 1), Rita's mother
 Line Kruse as Gitte Nielsen (season 1), Rita's sister
 Laura Bach as Gitte Nielsen (season 2), Rita's sister
 Kristian Halken as Flemming (season 2), teacher
 Nikolaj Dencker Schmidt as Alex (season 5), Jeppe's boyfriend
 Lisbeth Dahl as Gudrun (season 5), Ole's grandmother

Episodes

Series overview

Season 1 (2012)

Season 2 (2013)

Season 3 (2015)

Season 4 (2017)

Season 5 (2020)

Reception

Critical response 
Henrik Palle wrote for Politiken that the series "works really well with some characters who actually look like people".

Awards and nominations

Related media

Spin-off 
Hjørdis follows the eponymous teacher as she tries to put together a school play about bullying. It was broadcast between 18 May and 8 June 2015, consisting of four episodes.

Adaptations 
A US remake was planned with a pilot episode filmed in 2013, starring Anna Gunn, but it was not picked up as a series. In 2019, American premium cable network Showtime commissioned a pilot order for a remake starring Lena Headey. The series was to be a joint production between Showtime Networks and Platform One Media, with Torpe  serving as showrunner and writing the pilot episode and Headey also acting as executive producer. This pilot was not picked up for a full series either.

A Dutch remake called Tessa was made, airing in November 2015 on NPO 1, lasting only one season. The lead role was played by Thekla Reuten, following the storyline of Rita Season one, with only a few changes. The series has also been remade in France by TF1 as Sam, starring Mathilde Seigner in the title role for the first season. The second season of Sam entered production in 2017 with Natacha Lindinger replacing Seigner in the title role. The show has aired three seasons to date.

References

External links 
 
 Rita at TV 2

2012 Danish television series debuts
2020 Danish television series endings
2010s LGBT-related comedy television series
2010s LGBT-related drama television series
2010s school television series
2020s LGBT-related comedy television series
2020s LGBT-related drama television series
2020s school television series
Danish-language television shows
Television series about educators
Television shows set in Denmark
TV 2 (Denmark) original programming